Semantic Analysis is a book written by American philosopher Paul Ziff. It was first published in 1960 but has been reprinted at least four times since.

Synopsis
The book is, as the title suggests, about a semantic analysis of language, and particularly the word "Good" as it is used in English.

Composition
The book is written in a large number of numbered paragraphs 246 to be exact. It also includes a short preface. The writing style is thus similar to Wittgenstein's Tractatus Logico-Philosophicus. The book has six chapters (Language, Semantic Analysis, Conditions, Truth Conditions, Meaning, The Word 'Good'), a bibliography and an index.

References
Paul Ziff, "Semantic Analysis, 1960, Cornell University Press

External links
Paul Benacerraf, "Review: Paul Ziff, Semantic Analysis", Journal of Symbolic Logic, Volume 29, Issue 4 (1964), 193–194. review at projecteuclid.org.

Books in semantics